"Who Needs You Baby" is a song co-written and recorded by American country music artist Clay Walker. It was released in September 1995 as the lead-off single to his album Hypnotize the Moon.  It peaked at #2 in both the United States and Canada.  The song was written by Walker, Kim Williams and Randy Boudreaux.

Critical reception
Larry Flick of Billboard gave the song a positive review writing "It boasts a catchy chorus, lots of steel, and Walker's enjoyable delivery. Country radio readily embraces Walker, and this solid effort should give them lots to be happy about."

Music video
The music video features kids and people at a movie theater watching Clay Walker in an old black-and-white-themed movie titled "The Singing Cowboy". It was directed by Steven T. Miller and R. Brad Murano. The video was filmed at the Plaza Theatre  in Carrollton, Texas and on a ranch near Santa Fe, New Mexico. It peaked at #1 on CMT's Top 12 Countdown (now CMT's Top 20 Countdown) in 1995. The music video also received a "Special Jury Award" at Worldfest Houston in 1996.

Live performances
Walker performed "Who Needs You Baby" with the 350 member University of Texas marching band at half time of the University of Texas/University of Oklahoma game at the Cotton Bowl on October 14, 1995.

Chart positions

Charts

Year-end charts

References

1995 singles
Clay Walker songs
Songs written by Randy Boudreaux
Songs written by Clay Walker
Songs written by Kim Williams (songwriter)
Song recordings produced by James Stroud
Giant Records (Warner) singles
1995 songs